Crestview High School is a public high school in Convoy, Ohio in Van Wert County.

Ohio High School Athletic Association State Championships
 Girls Softball – 2005, 2012, 2016 
 Boys Basketball - 2014, 2019

References

External links
District Website

Educational institutions in the United States with year of establishment missing
High schools in Van Wert County, Ohio
Public high schools in Ohio